Shaft County is in Gilan province, Iran. The capital of the county is the city of Shaft. At the 2006 census, the county's population was 63,375 in 16,466 households. The following census in 2011 counted 58,543 people in 17,790 households. At the 2016 census, the county's population was 54,226 in 18,416 households.

Administrative divisions

The population history of Shaft County's administrative divisions over three consecutive censuses is shown in the following table. The latest census shows two districts, four rural districts, and two cities.

References

 

Counties of Gilan Province